Nitrianske Hrnčiarovce is a village and municipality in the Nitra District in western central Slovakia, in the Nitra Region.

History
In historical records the village was first mentioned in 1113.

Geography
The village lies at an altitude of 215 metres and covers an area of 9.946 km². It has a population of about 1820 people.

Ethnicity
The village is approximately 65% Slovak and 33% Magyar and 2% Gypsy.

Facilities
The village has a public library and a football pitch.

References

External links
 Official website
 http://www.statistics.sk/mosmis/eng/run.html

Villages and municipalities in Nitra District
Hungarian communities in Slovakia